Mayta Cápac (Quechua Mayta Qhapaq Inka) was the fourth Sapa Inca of the Kingdom of Cuzco (beginning around 1290 CE) and a member of the Hurin dynasty.

Family and personal
As a son of King Lloque Yupanqui, Mayta Cápac was his heir and the father of Cápac Yupanqui. His wife's name is given as Mama Tankariy Yachiy, or Tacucaray, or Mama Cuca.  His other children were Tarco Huaman, Apu Cunti Mayta, Queco Avcaylli, and Rocca Yupanqui.

Mayta's mother was Mama Cora Ocllo Coya. She died in Cuzco.

Reign
Mayta Capac was referred to as the reformer of the calendar. The chroniclers describe him as a great warrior who conquered territories as far as Lake Titicaca, Arequipa, and Potosí. While in fact, his kingdom was still limited to the valley of Cuzco.  In 1134, Mayta Cápac put the regions of Arequipa and Moquegua under the control of the Inca empire.

His great military feat was the subjugation of Alcabisas and Culunchimas tribes.

References 

13th-century births
Inca emperors
13th-century monarchs in South America
14th-century monarchs in South America
Year of death unknown